Marc Limbert (born 3 October 1973, Mancot) is a Welsh football midfielder, currently with Welsh side Bangor City.

Limbert began his career as a trainee with Everton, but was released without making the first team. He joined Chester City, where he was to gain experience in The Football League by playing 14 league games in the 1992–93 season.

On leaving Chester a year later he joined Connah's Quay Nomads and played for Altrincham, leaving to join Colwyn Bay in July 1997. He subsequently had a brief spell with TNS before joining Rhyl in May 2003, having played on dual terms for Rhyl at the latter end of the previous season.

He re-joined Connah's Quay Nomads in 2006 but stayed for just the one season, following manager Neville Powell to Bangor City in June 2007. He was immediately made by captain at Farrar Road, and lifted the Welsh Cup in May 2008, scoring a penalty in extra-time in a 4-2 win against Llanelli AFC at Newtown's Latham Park. He captained the team in their 10-0 aggregate loss against Danish team FC Midtjylland in the UEFA Cup Preliminary First Round.

Marc is currently the assistant manager at Bangor, his first team appearances now only tending to come in the league cup.

Honours
 Welsh Premier League Team of the Year: 2003–04

External links
 Welsh Premier League Profile

References

1973 births
Living people
Sportspeople from Flintshire
Welsh footballers
Chester City F.C. players
Connah's Quay Nomads F.C. players
Altrincham F.C. players
Colwyn Bay F.C. players
The New Saints F.C. players
Rhyl F.C. players
Bangor City F.C. players
English Football League players
Cymru Premier players
Association football midfielders